The Primera Divisió (First Division), also known as Lliga Multisegur Assegurances for sponsorship reasons is the top level of men's football in Andorra.

The league was launched in 1995 sponsored by the local federation (Andorran Football Federation) which was created just one year before. Until then, clubs had played since 1970 in an amateur league without a structure or affiliation with any official institution. Since affiliation to UEFA and FIFA in 1996, Andorran clubs are able to compete in the UEFA competitions. Until 2015 the league was known as Lliga Grup Becier and during 2016 Lliga Grup Sant Eloi. It was renamed in 2017 as Lliga Multisegur Assegurances for sponsorship reasons.

All the teams in the league play in the same stadiums owned by the federation. The same occurs in all other Andorran competitions, such as the Copa Constitució and Supercopa.

FC Andorra, one of the major clubs in the country based in Andorra la Vella have never played in this league. They play in the Spanish league system, and are registered with the Royal Spanish Football Federation.

League System
The eight clubs that play in the league play each other three times in the same venue. After the first 21 rounds, the league splits in half, into a top four and bottom four. They then play the other three teams in their section twice more to give a total of 27 games. The last placed of the relegation round is relegated to Segona Divisió, the second highest football league in Andorra, while the penultimate classified play a two-legged relegation play-off against the runners-up of Segona Divisió. The number of teams of Primera Divisió has changed throughout the league's history:

1995–96: 10 clubs
1996–97: 12 clubs
1997–98: 11 clubs
1998–99: 12 clubs
1999–00: 7 clubs
2000–02: 8 clubs
2002–03: 9 clubs
2003–present: 8 clubs

Qualification for European competitions
The winner of the league wins a place in the UEFA Champions League qualifications round, while the runners-up of the league and the Cup winner win a place in the UEFA Europa League qualifications round.

Stadiums
The Andorran Football Federation organizes the matches of Primera Divisió and Segona Divisió in the stadiums owned by the local federation. Also the federation distributes the stadiums and fields for the training sessions for each team. Since the 2016–17 season, FC Encamp is the only club that has its own stadium (✚), located in Prada de Moles (Camp de Futbol d'Encamp). Until 2016 the Camp d'Esports d'Aixovall hosted former matches of Primera Divisió and Segona Divisió.

Location of stadiums

2020–21 clubs

Winners

a: The Andorran Football Federation counts the 1994-95 amateur league title as an official one.

Performance by club

Bold: indicates clubs currently playing in the top division.
a: Club currently out of competition.
b: Club dissolved.
c: Founder members that have never been relegated from Primera Divisió.

Performance by parish

All-time Primera Divisió table
The All-time Primera Divisió table is an overall record of all match results, points, and goals of every team that has played since its inception in 1995. The table is accurate as of the end of the 2020–21 season. Teams in bold are part of the 2022–23 Primera Divisió. Play-offs games are not included.

League or status at 2020–21 season:

Topscorers

References

External links
UEFA.com - Andorra
Federació Andorrana de Fútbol
 League321.com - Andorran football league tables, records & statistics database. 
Andorra - List of Champions, RSSSF.com

 
1
Andorra
1995 establishments in Andorra
Sports leagues established in 1995
Football